Tea Collection is a San Francisco-based children's clothing company co-founded in 2002 by Emily Meyer and Leigh Rawdon. The clothing line is available through their e-commerce website as well as department stores and clothing boutiques worldwide.

History
Tea Collection was co-founded in 2002 by Emily Meyer and Leigh Rawdon through funding from angel investors. The inspiration came after a trip Meyer took to Brussels, Belgium, who stated "I found was pink bunny-themed clothing. I wanted something more sophisticated and modern. (No offense to pink bunnies.) That experience inspired me to envision a brand that celebrates the beauty of world cultures through fashion and lifestyle products. I called it Tea, because tea the drink is something shared by all cultures. It evokes warmth, wisdom, and timelessness—values that I wanted for the collection."

Since 2012, the company has had a 24 percent compound annual growth rate and seen its headcount more than triple. Revenue in 2014 was more than $40 million, nearly a $10 million increase from the year before.

Awards and Recognitions
Co-founder Leigh Rawdon received the Visa Technology Award from the San Francisco Small Business Network in May 2010.

Since 2007, Tea Collection has been in the Inc. (magazine) list of top 100 consumer products and retail companies.

References

External links
Official Website
Military Morale Patch

2000s fashion
American companies established in 2002
Clothing companies established in 2002
Retail companies established in 2002
Clothing retailers of the United States
Companies based in San Francisco
2002 establishments in California